This is a list of Marilyn hills and mountains in the United Kingdom, Isle of Man and Ireland by height. Thus, Marilyns can be mountains, with a height above , or relatively small hills.  there were 2,011 recorded Marilyns.

Definition

The Marilyn classification was created by Alan Dawson in his 1992 book The Relative Hills of Britain. The name Marilyn was coined by Dawson as a punning contrast to the Munro classification of Scottish mountains above , but which has no explicit prominence threshold, being homophonous with (Marilyn) Monroe.  The list of Marilyns was extended to Ireland by Clem Clements.

Marilyn was the first of several subsequent British Isles classifications that rely solely on prominence, including the P600s, the HuMPs, and the TuMPs.  Topographic prominence is a more difficult to estimate than topographic elevation, requiring surveys of each contour line around a peak, and therefore lists using prominence are subject to revision.

Although many of the islands' largest mountains, including Ben Nevis, Carrantuohill, Scafell Pike and Snowdon, are Marilyns, many other large peaks such as Cairn Gorm, a number of Munros, and well-known hills such as Bowfell, the Langdale Pikes and Carnedd Dafydd, are not Marilyns because they do not have sufficient height relative to the surrounding terrain (i.e. they have taller "parents"). Not all Marilyns are even hills in the usual sense: Crowborough sits in a town, whilst Bishop Wilton Wold highest point of the Yorkshire Wolds lies alongside the A166 road.

, there were 2,011 Marilyns in the British Isles, with 1,219 Marilyns in Scotland, including 202 of the 282 Scottish Munros; Munros with a Marilyn–prominence are sometimes called Real Munros.  There were a further 454 Marilyns in Ireland, 175 in England, 158 in Wales, and 5 in the Isle of Man.  On 13 October 2014 Rob Woodall and Eddie Dealtry became the first people to climb all 1,557 Marilyns in Great Britain. , 10 Marilynists had climbed the 1,557 Marilyns of Great Britain, while 270 had entered the Marilyn Hall of Fame by climbing over 600 Marilyns.

Coverage

, the list of 2,011 British Isles Marilyns contained:

By height and prominence
This list was downloaded from the Database of British and Irish Hills ("DoBIH") in October 2018, and are peaks the DoBIH marks as Marilyns ("M").  As topological prominence is complex to measure, these tables are subject to revision over time, and should not be amended or updated unless the entire DoBIH data is re-downloaded.  The tables are structured to show rankings by height and prominence over the entire British Isles, or by region.

Bibliography

DoBIH codes
The DoBIH uses the following codes for the various classifications of mountains and hills in the British Isles, which many of the above peaks also fall into:

suffixes:
=	twin

See also

List of British Isles mountains by height
Lists of mountains and hills in the British Isles
List of mountains in Ireland
List of Munro mountains in Scotland
List of Murdos (mountains)
List of Furths in the British Isles
List of P600 mountains in the British Isles

Notes

References

External links

The Database of British and Irish Hills (DoBIH), the largest database of British Isles mountains
Hill Bagging UK & Ireland, the searchable interface for the DoBIH
MountainViews: The Irish Mountain Website, the DoBIH for Ireland (Republic and North)
MountainViews: Irish Online Mountain Database, the searchable database for the MountainViews
The Relative Hills of Britain, a website dedicated to mountain and hill classification
 Google Earth .kmz file showing all Marilyns

Marilyns
 
Articles with OS grid coordinates